Kim Song-il is a politician of the Democratic People's Republic of Korea (North Korea). He is a full member of the Central Committee of the Workers' Party of Korea and chairman of the Provincial Party Committee of the South Hamgyong Province.

Biography
In May 2016, he was appointed a member of the 7th Central Committee of the Workers' Party of Korea and Chairman of the Party Committee of South Hamgyong Province, replacing Thae Jong-su.

On September 5, 2020, he was dismissed by Kim Jong-un following the damage caused by Typhoon Maysak. It was reported and he was replaced by a vice director from the Organizational Leadership Department who has not yet been named. Kim Jong-un relieved him of command due to not being prepared for the typhoon and for an inadequate response following the typhoon.

References

Workers' Party of Korea politicians
Living people
Year of birth missing (living people)